Johann Andreas Dieze (Leipzig, 1729 - Mainz, September 25, 1785) was a German Hispanist, translator and librarian.

He translated into German the work of Luis José Velázquez Orígenes de la poesía castellana.

References

External links
 Johann Andreas Dieze at Wikisource (in German)

1729 births
1785 deaths
Writers from Leipzig
German librarians
German Hispanists
German translators
Spanish–German translators
German male non-fiction writers
18th-century German translators